Professional Dreamers is the fifth album by the Swedish hip hop group Looptroop Rockers.

Release
It was released in 2011, by Bad Taste Records.

It is the first album released after the comeback of band member CosM.I.C..

It was the second album released under the name Looptroop Rockers.

Track listing
Don't Wanna Wake Up
Professional Dreamers
Any Day
This Music Sounds Better at Night (feat. Mastercat)
Do (feat. Gnucci Banana)
On Repeat
Sweep Me Away
Blow Me Away
Darkness
El Clasico
Magic (feat. Chords)
Late Nights Early Mornings
Joseph (feat. Lisa Ekdahl)

External links 
 

2011 albums
Looptroop Rockers albums
Bad Taste Records albums